Ot (Ѿ ѿ; italics: Ѿ ѿ) is a letter of the early Cyrillic alphabet. Though it originated as a ligature of the letters Omega (Ѡ ѡ) and Te (Т т), it functions as a discrete letter of the alphabet, placed between х and ц. This can be seen in the first printed Cyrillic abecedarium (illustrated), and continues in modern usage.

Ot is used in Church Slavonic to represent the preposition отъ 'from' and prefix от-.  It does not stand for this sequence of letters in any other context, nor can the sequence от be substituted for it where it does occur. It is used with a similar purpose in mediaeval manuscripts of other Slavonic languages written with the Cyrillic alphabet. In printed books ѿ is often used in preference to (ѡ҃) for the numeral 800.

Computing codes

References 

    
Cyrillic ligatures